Adolfo Gori (born 13 February 1939) is a retired Italian professional footballer who played as a defender.

Club career

Rochester Lancers 
In 1972, Gori became a player-coach for the Rochester Lancers of the North American Soccer League. In 1977, he was named to the Rochester Lancers Team of the Decade.

International career 
Gori had his first and only appearance for the Italian national team on 25 June 1967 in a 1–0 win against Romania.

Honours
Juventus
 Serie A champion: 1966–67.
 Coppa Italia winner: 1964–65.

References

External links
 

1939 births
Living people
People from Viareggio
Italian footballers
Italy international footballers
Italian football managers
Italian expatriate footballers
Expatriate soccer players in the United States
Italian expatriate sportspeople in the United States
Serie A players
S.S.D. Lucchese 1905 players
S.P.A.L. players
Juventus F.C. players
Brescia Calcio players
Rochester Lancers (1967–1980) players
North American Soccer League (1968–1984) coaches
North American Soccer League (1968–1984) players
Association football defenders
Player-coaches
Italian expatriate football managers
Sportspeople from the Province of Lucca
Footballers from Tuscany